Euphorbia nicaeensis is a species of flowering plant in the family Euphorbiaceae.

Subspecies
Euphorbia nicaeensis subsp. glareosa (Pallas ex Bieb.) A.R. Sm. 
Euphorbia nicaeensis subsp. nicaeensis

Description
It has erect, simple, ocher-orange stems, usually leafless and covered with leaf scars on most of its length. The flowering period extends from June to August.

Distribution
This species can be found in southern and eastern Europe (Spain, Portugal, Italy, Croatia), in Turkey, in the Caucasus and in Algeria.

References

nicaensis